Hans Klenk (28 October 1919, in Künzelsau – 24 March 2009, in Vellberg) was a racing driver from Germany. He participated in one World Championship Grand Prix on 3 August 1952 and did not score any championship points. Klenk won the 1952 edition of La Carrera Panamericana in a Mercedes Benz W194, along with Karl Kling.

Complete World Drivers' Championship results 
(key)

References

External links
 Hans Klenk, full biography 
 Entry at the Formula 1 database
 Tribute to him by his friends upon his death (German language)

German racing drivers
German Formula One drivers
1919 births
2009 deaths
24 Hours of Le Mans drivers
People from Künzelsau
Sportspeople from Stuttgart (region)
Racing drivers from Baden-Württemberg
Carrera Panamericana drivers